The Battle of Gravelines is the name given to two battles: 

The Battle of Gravelines (1558), in which Spain defeated France in 1558.
The Battle of Gravelines (1588), which saw an indecisive engagement between Spanish and English fleets during the attempted Spanish invasion of England in 1588.